Luckeus is a genus of prehistoric lobe-finned fish. Luckeus belonged to the group of onychodontid fishes. It lived during the Early Devonian to Middle Devonian period (Emsian to Eifelian faunal stages) in central Australia.

Description 
Luckeus is only known by a left lower jaw, which is the holotype (ANU V2969) of the genus, and also by some isolated teeth (ANU V3108-3112). Before palaeontologists establish a genus name for these remains, they referred to them as "onychodontid" and "crossopterygian" remains, or more specific as "onychodontid teeth remains". In 2005, palaeontologists Gavin Young and Hans-Peter Schultze described these findings and assigned them to a new genus under the name Luckeus. Young and Schultze named Luckeus after the nickname "Lucke" of the late palaeontologist Dr. Hans Ludolph Jessen due to his major study of Paleozoic bony fish. The type species, Luckeus abudda, named after the Abudda Lakes located in the Simpson Desert, about 15 kilometers of the fossil Mereenie Sandstone.

References

 

Onychodontida
Prehistoric lobe-finned fish genera
Devonian bony fish
Prehistoric fish of Australia